The Meanwood Valley Trail is a waymarked footpath and the title of an annual (March/April) footrace that takes place on parts of the trail in Leeds, West Yorkshire, England. For most of its route (to King Lane) it is the official Leeds link to the Dales Way. Along the way are signs giving information about the local wildlife.

Some of the upper reaches of the trail are used for an annual trail running race each March/April, organised by local running club the Valley Striders. This race has over 300 participants each year and is part of the Airedale Triple, which also includes the Baildon Boundary Way and the Guiseley Gallop.

Route
The path is waymarked in both directions and can be started at any point, but is described here Northwards from the Marsden Statue on Woodhouse Moor divided into parts and sections which correspond with the old edition of the official map a new one which includes minor route changes was produced in 2013.

Stage 1 - Woodhouse Moor to Meanwood Park
Section 1: At the junction of Woodhouse Lane and Raglan Road, the statue of Henry Marsden is visible. By this is a map sign (currently vandalised) and an arrow pointing to Raglan Road. Follow Raglan Road north to its junction with Rampart Road, turn right, continue over crossroads and head up Delph Lane.

Section 2: At the end of Delph Lane turn left on a footpath to walk along Woodhouse Ridge. Follow the top path keeping the stone wall to your left. At a metal gate, go down the steps ahead and bear right on the path until you come to Meanwood Beck. Turn left (with the stream on your right) until you leave the Ridge and cross a main road, Grove Lane.

Section 3: The footpath continues behind some back gardens on your left to another road, Monkbridge Road. Cross over turning right, and take the first left, Mill Pond Lane, then take the footpath immediately to the left. The path turns sharply to the right through some allotments, then reaches housing and just before reaching the road at Hollin Drive turn right to cross Meanwood Beck at a waymarker post. The trail passes the disused cricket ground of Highbury CC on the right and turns left over a small bridge over the beck to enter the picnic area of Meanwood Park.

Stage 2 - Meanwood Park to the Outer Ring Road
Section 5: Keep to the right hand side of Meanwood Beck (though you can cross and re-cross the many little bridges) going upstream and north until you pass through an arch in a stone wall. (If you take the left side of the Beck, there is a big stone arched bridge just before this point.)  Turn left across a wooden bridge, then right into woods.

Section 6: Follow this path over a weir. (If you want a detour go left over small bridges and uphill to gardens known as The Hollies.) Then cross a bridge over a larger weir, then bear left, passing through a gateway and following the Beck until the path reaches Parkside Road.

Stage 3 - Ring Road to Stairfoot Lane
Section 7: Turn left and cross the road.  Follow it almost to the Ring Road.   There is a footpath on the right which eventually runs to a tunnel under the Ring Road. Coming out of this, turn right up some steps and follow the path with the Beck on your right, entering Scotland Woods.  Turn right to cross the Beck over the stone remains of Scotland Mill's dam. (Note: as an alternative, at the junction to turn right, you could keep left and simply follow the high route until reaching the Seven Arches Aqueduct)

Section 8: Once over the beck turn right for approx 100 metres uphill to reach a wide track and turn left to follow the high path through the woods.  Pass under the Seven Arches Aqueduct (built 1840, but disused) and bear right through Adel Woods keeping to the higher path with the beck (now Adel Beck) to your left.

Section 9:   There is a carved water spout known as the "Slabbering Baby" on the right. It probably dates from the mid-1800s.  Just after this, cross a second beck and go up a slope with a small pond on the left and immediately beyond this follow a (waymarked) path bearing to the right which leads to a car park off Stairfoot Lane (keep an eye out for the waymarker arrows that are painted on trees/rocks to indicate the correct way). (Another slight detour: follow the main path from the car park about 100 m into the woods then a path on the left another 100 m leads to large stones known as Adel Crag.)

Stage 4 - Stairfoot Lane to Golden Acre Park
Section 10:  Cross Stairfoot Lane and join a bridleway opposite the car park, continue along the obvious path as it rises uphill avoiding any deviations to reach a waymarker post indicating bridleway directions. At this point the old gateway is long since missing (and the stile to the right inevitably unused). Go through the gap and enter the grassy field to follow the field edge on your right to reach a wide, tree/bush lined track (with Headingley Golf Course on your left) to reach King Lane at Golf Farm. Cross the road and turn left following King Lane. Do not walk the main road (it can be very busy), instead take the obvious path that uses the road verge.

Section 11: At a junction of 5 roads, carry on ahead (with the narrow woodland briefly on your right), again following the verge path up King Lane.  At the next junction a gate ahead across the road leads into Golden Acre Park.  Follow the path to reach the lake and go either left or right around the lake to reach an underpass which goes under the Otley Road.  You will find yourself on raised wooded paths over Breary Marsh, and the end of the trail.  The Golden Acre car park is immediately adjacent, and the main Otley Road has bus services to Leeds, Otley, Ilkley or Skipton (the latter Mon-Sat). To the north west of the main lake there are toilets & a cafe.

Notes and references

External links
Meanwood Valley Trail Leaflet (2013 edition) http://www.leeds.gov.uk/docs/MVT%20leaflet%20for%20web.pdf
Meanwood Valley Local Nature Reserve] on Leeds City Council website http://www.leeds.gov.uk/leisure/Pages/Meanwood-Valley-Local-Nature-Reserve.aspx
Meanwood Valley Partnership http://www.meanwoodvalleypartnership.co.uk
Woodhouse Ridge Action Group 
Meanwood Valley Trail Online Guide

Meanwood
Tourist attractions in Leeds
Footpaths in West Yorkshire